Big Eye Music is a Los Angeles-based production company and independent record label founded in 2000.  Big Eye Music was the first label to focus exclusively on cover, karaoke, and instrumental versions of songs from a wide variety of genres, including rock, hip hop, country, and K-pop.  The label also specializes in acoustic, symphonic, and lounge renditions of Billboard Hot 100 hits. Big Eye has worked with Blackstreet, Salt-n-Pepa, Coolio, and others who have used Big Eye's recordings as backing tracks for live performances as well as studio recordings. The collective has also seen their work sampled by European DJs and electronic music producers.

History 

Big Eye was started by a group of professional artists, studio musicians and engineers in the UK.  As technology improved the ability to transfer large sound files from one location to another, the Big Eye production team soon found ways to expand their roster to include members from countries all across the globe such as the U.S., Germany and elsewhere.

The Rock Heroes version

The Rock Heroes are one of the artist collectives operating under the Big Eye Music banner specializing in modern and classic rock.  As of early 2013, they have released over 50 albums both digitally and physically.  The group achieved their biggest success when their version of Kid Rock’s “All Summer Long” debuted at No. 38 on the Billboard Hot 100 charts and then rose to No. 29 the next week.  In Canada, it debuted at No. 16 on the Canadian Hot 100.

Charts

K-POP All-Start 
This artist collective, specializing in Korean Pop music, saw their version of PSY’s smash hit single “Gangnam Style” out sell the original version in Japan.  The track climbed as high as No. 67 on the iTunes  Japan singles chart.

Original content 
In recent years, Big Eye Music has begun to produce original content in the new age, ambient and electronic genres.

See also 
 List of record labels

References

External links
 Official site
 Allrecordlabels.com

American independent record labels
Record labels established in 1992